Marek Zmhral (born 10 August 1993) is a Czech volleyball player for Volejbal Brno and the Czech national team.

He participated at the 2017 Men's European Volleyball Championship.

References

1993 births
Living people
Czech men's volleyball players